Canadian Homes and Gardens was a magazine published by Maclean-Hunter in Canada from 1925 until 1962, succeeded by Canadian Homes, which was published until 1978. 
It targeted an upper middle class or upper class market, mainly of women, giving advice on home decoration. The distinction between editorial content and advertising was blurred.

History
John Bayne Maclean purchased the magazine in 1925.
From then until January 1960 Maclean-Hunter published thirty seven volumes of the magazine. In 1930 Maclean-Hunter published the 242-page Canadian homes and gardens : book of houses. Canadian Homes and Gardens was sold in 1962. It was succeeded by Canadian Homes. This magazine, devoted to interior decoration, was published by Maclean-Hunter until 1978.

Audience
Canadian Homes and Gardens targeted urban readers from the upper and upper-middle classes. It competed with U.S. magazines such as Better Homes and Gardens, publishing feature articles on home planning and "gracious living". In the 1920s Canadian Homes and Gardens carried stories and illustrations of developments in furniture and appliance design, including Art Deco styles.

At this time Art Deco was associated with a wealthy elite who want to be seen as modern and cosmopolitan.

During the Great Depression, the magazine painted an upbeat picture when describing the 1933-34 radios, linking them to high culture, adventure and the home:

Lorrie Dunington-Grubb (1877–1945), a Toronto-based landscape architect who co-founded Sheridan Nurseries, wrote articles on garden design for Canadian Homes and Gardens. The magazine also helped to promote Canadian nationhood through the concept of a popular Canadian culture expressed in terms of residential aesthetics.
Thus in July 1929 Canadian Homes and Gardens published an article on a project by the architect Elizabeth Lalor Harding to convert a farmhouse in the Muskoka region into a summer residence. She was interested in developing a Canadian style of architecture.
Around 1945 the Greater Vancouver region emerged as a center of architectural modernism, with elegant and innovative designs.
This regional style was given extensive coverage in Canadian Homes and Gardens.

Advertising
The boundary between editorial content and advertisements was blurred, since the purpose of the magazine was to help the reader choose what to buy. Articles were complemented by advertisements for related products, and were spread through the magazine.
The reader had to work through many pages of advertisements to read an entire article.

The magazine devoted an entire issue to the modernist movement of interior decoration, promoting a show of art moderne by the T. Eaton Company, a chain of department stores.
Eaton's College Street was called "one of the few great stores of the world", and was presented as the authority on good taste for middle class urban women. In 1930 an issue of Canadian Homes and Gardens had several pages devoted to the period furniture rooms in the Eaton's College Street store in Toronto. According to the magazine,

The magazine avoided controversy. In 1954-55 there was disagreement between the male-dominated National Industrial Design Council and the Consumers' Association of Canada (CAC), whose members were mostly women. The Design Council refused to require performance testing, and  routinely gave awards to products that women in the CAC thought were faulty, but refused awards to products the CAC favored. Kathleen Harrison of the CAC wrote an article discussing the issue called "How Good is Design Award Merchandise", but Canadian Homes and Gardens decided not to publish it.

The CAC was given the message that women were expected to accept product designs, not contribute to them.

References
Notes

Citations

Sources

1925 establishments in Quebec
1962 disestablishments in Canada
Lifestyle magazines published in Canada
Monthly magazines published in Canada
Defunct magazines published in Canada
Magazines established in 1925
Magazines disestablished in 1962
Magazines published in Montreal